The Constitutional Court of Kyrgyzstan was formerly the highest court of Kyrgyzstan's legal system. It judges on the constitutionality of laws and is composed of nine judges. Critics argue that its politically charged judgement such as allowing President Akayev to re-run for President despite the Presidency being limited by term limits are evidence of a lack of judicial independence. The Constitutional Court was abolished in 2010 with the adoption of the new Constitution and its powers transferred to the Supreme Court.

See also
Courts of Kyrgyzstan

References

Judiciary of Kyrgyzstan